Mount Kumbhakarna  or Jannu (Limbu: Phoktanglungma) is the 32nd-highest mountain in the world. It is an important western outlier of Kangchenjunga, the world's third-highest peak. Kumbhakarna is a large and steep peak in its own right, and has numerous challenging climbing routes.

The official name of this peak is Kumbhakarna, but the designation Jannu is still better known. It is called Phoktanglungma, literally "mountain with shoulders" (phoktang means "shoulder" and lungma means "mountain"), in the Limbu language, and is sacred in the Kirant religion.

Location

Kumbhakarna is the highest peak of the Kumbhakarna Section of the Kangchenjunga Himal (using H. Adams Carter's classification), which straddles the border between Nepal and Sikkim, and lies entirely within Nepal. A long ridge connects it with Kangchenjunga to the east.

Notable features

Kumbhakarna is the 32nd highest mountain in the world 
(using a cutoff of 500m prominence, or re-ascent).
It is more notable for its climbing challenge, and is one of the hardest peaks in the world in
terms of technical difficulty because of its complex structure, its vertical relief, and the particularly steep climbing near the summit. The north face, in particular, has been the scene of some of the most technical (and controversial) climbing achieved at altitudes over 7000m.

Climbing history

Kumbhakarna Jannu was first reconnoitered in 1957 by Guido Magnone, and first attempted in 1959 by a French team led by Jean Franco. It was first climbed in 1962 by a team led by the French alpinist Lionel Terray. Those reaching the summit were René Desmaison, Paul Keller, Robert Paragot and Gyalzen Mitchung Sherpa (April 27) and Lionel Terray, André Bertraud, Jean Bouvier, Pierre Leroux, Yves Pollet-Villard, Jean Ravier and Wangdi Sherpa (April 28). 

Their route started from the Yamatari Glacier south of the peak and followed a circuitous route to the large plateau known as the Throne (a hanging glacier south of the summit), continuing to the summit via the southeast ridge. 

The Huge, steep north face (the so-called "Wall of Shadows") was first climbed in 1976 by a Japanese team led by Masatsugu Konishi (:ja:小西政継, by a route that starts on the left side of the face and then meets the east ridge, avoiding the steep headwall at the top of the face (though a New Zealand team had climbed the north face the previous year without proceeding to the summit). A Slovenian climber, Tomo Česen, claimed a solo ascent of a more direct route on the face in 1989, but this claim is considered suspect by many in the climbing community.

In 2004, after a failed attempt the previous year, a Russian team led by Alexander Odintsov succeeded in climbing the direct north face route through the headwall. This required big-wall aid techniques in a sustained, committing setting at over 7500m, a major achievement. However some in the climbing community were upset to learn that the Russians left a good deal of equipment on the wall, provoking a debate over what constitutes appropriate modern style on such a route.  Despite the controversy, the team won the Piolet d'Or for the ascent.

The Himalayan Index lists over a dozen ascents of Jannu; there may be others that have not been written up in climbing literature.

Gallery

References

External links

 Himalayan Index
 DEM files for the Himalaya (Corrected versions of SRTM data)

Seven-thousanders of the Himalayas
Mountains of Koshi Province